Annika Klose (born 14 July 1993 in Göttingen), known professionally as Anna Naklab, is a German singer-songwriter.   
Naklab grew up in the town of Northeim in the German state of Lower Saxony near Göttingen, Germany.  Singers and bands that inspire her very much are Adele, Amy Winehouse and Room Eleven.

Career 
In 2013, Anna Naklab worked with German producer and DJ Parra for Cuva on a cover version (remix) of Chris Isaak's original 1989 song titled "Wicked Game". The remix was re-titled as "Wicked Games" (plural). 
"Wicked Games" was first released on Beatport, a U.S. based electronica website, as a digital download in August 2013. A mainstream release followed as a digital download in France in October 2013 and Germany in February 2014. The song charted at number 1 in the United Kingdom and charted in Australia, France, Belgium, Netherlands and other European nations.

In early 2015, Anna Naklab, German producer and DJ Alle Farben and Younotus released a cover version of the German band Reamonn's original 2000 song titled "Supergirl". In July 2015 Anna Naklab's version of "Supergirl" charted at number 1 in Austria and number 2 on Germany's Top Forty Charts. The official music video of Anna's Supergirl, posted on YouTube, received over 63,500,000 views in less than one year.

Discography

Singles

As featured artist

Awards
 Nominated as Best Female Artist...1LIVE Krone (2015)

References

External links

 
 Anna Naklab Facebook page
 Official SoundCloud page

1993 births
German women singers
Living people
Musicians from Göttingen
21st-century German women singers